The year 1982 in architecture involved some significant architectural events and new buildings.

Buildings and structures

Buildings opened

 January 28 – Jatiyo Sangshad Bhaban, the National Parliament Building in Dhaka, Bangladesh, designed by Louis Kahn.
 April 29 – Sri Lankan Parliament Building in Kotte, designed by Geoffrey Bawa.
 October 12 – National Gallery of Australia in Canberra, ACT, designed by Colin Madigan.
 November 13 – Vietnam Veterans Memorial in Washington, D.C., designed by Maya Ying Lin, is dedicated.

Buildings completed

 JPMorgan Chase Tower in Houston, Texas, United States.
 Rheinturm Düsseldorf in Germany.
 Abteiberg Museum in Mönchengladbach, Germany, designed by Hans Hollein.
 First Canadian Centre in Calgary, Alberta
 Nexen Building, Calgary in Calgary, Alberta
 Kuwait National Assembly Building, designed by Jørn Utzon.
 Rare Books Library, Newnham College, Cambridge, designed by van Heyningen and Haward.
 Hamer Hall, part of the Arts Centre complex, in Melbourne, Australia.
 Georgia Pacific Tower in Atlanta, Georgia, United States.
 TV-am Breakfast Television Centre in Camden Town, London, designed by Terry Farrell.
 Inmos microprocessor factory in Newport, Wales, designed by the Richard Rogers Partnership.
 BellSouth Building in Atlanta, Georgia, United States.
 Tower of the Juche Idea in Pyongyang, North Korea.
 Main chapel of Wat Phra Dhammakaya in Thailand.
 Akasaka Prince Hotel in Tokyo, Japan.
 Atlantis Condominium in Miami, Florida.
 December – Renault Centre in Swindon, England, designed by Norman Foster.

Awards
 AIA Gold Medal – Romaldo Giurgola
 Alvar Aalto Medal – Jørn Utzon
 Architecture Firm Award – Gwathmey Siegel & Associates, Architects LLC
 Grand prix national de l'architecture – Claude Vasconi
 Pritzker Prize – Kevin Roche
 RAIA Gold Medal – John Overall (architect)
 RIBA Royal Gold Medal – Berthold Lubetkin
 Twenty-five Year Award – Equitable Savings and Loan Building

Births

Deaths
 March 10 – Charles N. Agree, American architect (born 1897)
 March 27 – Fazlur Rahman Khan, Bengal-born structural engineer (born 1929)
 April 20 – Şevki Balmumcu, Turkish architect (born 1905)
 May 21 – Giovanni Muzio, Italian architect (born 1893)
 August 4 – Bruce Goff, American architect (born 1904)
 November 8 – David Roberts, British architect (born 1911)
 November 16 – Peter Yates, English architect (born 1920)
 December 18 – Sir Richard Sheppard, English architect (born 1910)

References

 
20th-century architecture